Vermont Route 36 (VT 36) is a  state highway in Franklin County, Vermont, United States. It is an L-shaped highway running south and east from VT 78 in the village of Swanton in the north to VT 108 in the town of Bakersfield in the east. The portion from St. Albans Bay State Park to the eastern terminus in Bakersfield is maintained by the state, while the north–south portion is a town highway minor collector (route number 786).

Route description
VT 36 begins at an intersection with VT 78 in the village of Swanton, two blocks from VT 78's intersection with U.S. Route 7. The route briefly overlaps US 7 in the center of the city, and about a half-mile (0.8 km) later, intersects VT 104, a state highway providing access to Interstate 89 via exit 19. VT 36 proceeds east out of the city and into the mountains. It passes through the towns of Fairfield and East Fairfield and ends at an intersection with VT 108 in Bakersfield.

Major intersections

References

External links

036
Transportation in Franklin County, Vermont